Knowledge is a form of awareness or familiarity. It is often understood as awareness of facts or as practical skills, and may also mean familiarity with objects or situations. Knowledge of facts, also called propositional knowledge, is often defined as true belief that is distinct from opinion or guesswork by virtue of justification. While there is wide agreement among philosophers that propositional knowledge is a form of true belief, many controversies in philosophy focus on justification: whether it is needed at all, how to understand it, and whether something else besides it is needed. These controversies intensified due to a series of thought experiments by Edmund Gettier and have provoked various alternative definitions. Some of them deny that justification is necessary and suggest alternative criteria while others accept that justification is an essential aspect and formulate additional requirements.

Knowledge can be produced in many different ways. The most important source of empirical knowledge is perception, which is the usage of the senses. Many theorists also include introspection as a source of knowledge, not of external physical objects, but of one's own mental states. Other sources often discussed include memory, rational intuition, inference, and testimony. According to foundationalism, some of these sources are basic in the sense that they can justify beliefs without depending on other mental states. This claim is rejected by coherentists, who contend that a sufficient degree of coherence among all the mental states of the believer is necessary for knowledge. According to infinitism, an infinite chain of beliefs is needed.

Many different aspects of knowledge are investigated, and it plays a role in various disciplines. It is the primary subject of the field of epistemology, which studies what someone knows, how they come to know it, and what it means to know something. The problem of the value of knowledge concerns the question of why knowledge is more valuable than mere true belief. Philosophical skepticism is the thesis that humans lack any form of knowledge or that knowledge is impossible. Formal epistemology studies, among other things, the rules governing how knowledge and related states behave and in what relations they stand to each other. Science tries to acquire knowledge using the scientific method, which is based on repeatable experimentation, observation, and measurement. Many religions hold that humans should seek knowledge and that God or the divine is the source of knowledge.

Definitions 

Numerous definitions of knowledge have been suggested. Most definitions of knowledge in analytic philosophy recognize three fundamental types. "Knowledge-that", also called propositional knowledge, can be expressed using that-clauses as in "I know that Dave is at home". "Knowledge-how" (know-how) expresses practical competence, as in "she knows how to swim". Finally, "knowledge by acquaintance" refers to a familiarity with the known object based on previous direct experience. Analytical philosophers usually aim to identify the essential features of propositional knowledge in their definitions. There is wide, though not universal, agreement among philosophers that knowledge involves a cognitive success or an epistemic contact with reality, like making a discovery, and that propositional knowledge is a form of true belief.

Despite the agreement about these general characteristics of knowledge, many deep disagreements remain regarding its exact definition. These disagreements relate to the goals and methods within epistemology and other fields, or to differences concerning the standards of knowledge that people intend to uphold, for example, what degree of certainty is required. One approach is to focus on knowledge's most salient features in order to give a practically useful definition. Another is to try to provide a theoretically precise definition by listing the conditions that are individually necessary and jointly sufficient. The term "analysis of knowledge" (or equivalently, "conception of knowledge" or "theory of knowledge") is often used for this approach. It can be understood in analogy to how chemists analyze a sample by seeking a list of all the chemical elements composing it. An example of this approach is characterizing knowledge as justified true belief (JTB), which is seen by many philosophers as the standard definition. Others seek a common core among diverse forms of knowledge, for example, that they all involve some kind of awareness or that they all belong to a special type of successful performance.

Methodological differences concern whether researchers base their inquiry on abstract and general intuitions or on concrete and specific cases, referred to as methodism and particularism, respectively. Another source of disagreement is the role of ordinary language in one's inquiry: the weight given to how the term "knowledge" is used in everyday discourse. According to Ludwig Wittgenstein, for example, there is no clear-cut definition of knowledge since it is just a cluster of concepts related through family resemblance. Different conceptions of the standards of knowledge are also responsible for various disagreements. Some epistemologists, like René Descartes, hold that knowledge demands very high requirements, like certainty, and is therefore quite rare. Others see knowledge as a rather common phenomenon, prevalent in many everyday situations, without excessively high standards.

In analytic philosophy, knowledge is usually understood as a mental state possessed by an individual person, but the term is sometimes used to refer to a characteristic of a group of people as group knowledge, social knowledge, or collective knowledge. In a slightly different sense, it can also mean knowledge stored in documents, as in "knowledge housed in the library" or the knowledge base of an expert system. The English word knowledge is a broad term. It includes various meanings that some other languages distinguish using several words. For example, Latin uses the words cognitio and scientia for "knowledge" while Spanish uses the words conocer and saber for "to know". In ancient Greek, four important terms for knowledge were used: epistēmē (unchanging theoretical knowledge), technē (expert technical knowledge), mētis (strategic knowledge), and gnōsis (personal intellectual knowledge). Knowledge is often contrasted with ignorance, which is associated with a lack of understanding, education, and true beliefs. Epistemology, also referred to as the theory of knowledge, is the philosophical discipline studying knowledge. It investigates topics like the nature of knowledge and justification, how knowledge arises, and what value it has. Further issues include the different types of knowledge and the extent to which the beliefs of most people amount to knowledge as well as the limits of what can be known.

Justified true belief 

Many philosophers define knowledge as justified true belief (JTB). This definition characterizes knowledge through three essential features: as (1) a belief that is (2) true and (3) justified. In the dialogue Theaetetus by the ancient Greek philosopher Plato, Socrates pondered the distinction between knowledge and true belief but rejected the JTB definition of knowledge. The most widely accepted feature is truth: one can believe something false but one cannot know something false. A few ordinary language philosophers have raised doubts that knowledge is a form of belief based on everyday expressions like "I do not believe that; I know it". Most theorists reject this distinction and explain such expressions through ambiguities of natural language.

The main controversy surrounding the JTB definition concerns its third feature: justification. This component is often included because of the impression that some true beliefs are not forms of knowledge. Specifically, this covers cases of superstition, lucky guesses, or erroneous reasoning. The corresponding beliefs may even be true but it seems there is more to knowledge than just being right about something. The JTB definition solves this problem by identifying proper justification as the additional component needed, which is absent in the above-mentioned cases. Many philosophers have understood justification internalistically (internalism): a belief is justified if it is supported by another mental state of the person, such as a perceptual experience, a memory, or a second belief. This mental state has to constitute a sufficiently strong evidence or reason for the believed proposition. Some modern versions modify the JTB definition by using an externalist conception of justification instead. This means that justification depends not just on factors internal to the subject but also on external factors. According to reliabilist theories of justification, justified beliefs are produced by a reliable process. According to causal theories of justification, justification requires that the believed fact causes the belief. This is the case, for example, when a bird sits on a tree and a person forms a belief about this fact because they see the bird.

Gettier problem and alternatives 

The JTB definition came under severe criticism in the 20th century, when Edmund Gettier gave a series of counterexamples. They purport to present concrete cases of justified true beliefs that fail to constitute knowledge. The reason for their failure is usually a form of epistemic luck: the justification is not relevant to the truth. In a well-known example, there is a country road with many barn facades and only one real barn. The person driving is not aware of this, stops in front of the real barn by a lucky coincidence, and forms the belief that he is in front of a barn. It has been argued that this justified true belief does not constitute knowledge since the person would not have been able to tell the difference without the fortuitous accident. So even though the belief is justified, it is a lucky coincidence that it is also true.

The responses to these counterexamples have been diverse. According to some, they show that the JTB definition of knowledge is deeply flawed and that a radical reconceptualization of knowledge is necessary, often by denying justification a role. This can happen, for example, by replacing justification with reliability or by understanding knowledge as the manifestation of cognitive virtues. Another approach is to define it in regard to the cognitive role it plays. For example, one role of knowledge is to provide reasons for thinking something or for doing something. Various theorists are diametrically opposed to the radical reconceptualization and either deny that Gettier cases pose problems or they try to solve them by making smaller modifications to how justification is defined. Such approaches result in a minimal modification of the JTB definition.

Between these two extremes, some philosophers have suggested various moderate departures. They agree that the JTB definition includes some correct claims: justified true belief is a necessary condition of knowledge. However, they disagree that it is a sufficient condition. They hold instead that an additional criterion, some feature X, is necessary for knowledge. For this reason, they are often referred to as JTB+X definitions of knowledge. A closely related approach speaks not of justification but of warrant and defines warrant as justification together with whatever else is necessary to arrive at knowledge.

Many candidates for the fourth feature have been suggested. In this regard, knowledge may be defined as justified true belief that does not depend on any false beliefs, that there are no defeaters present, or that the person would not have the belief if it was false. Such and similar definitions are successful at avoiding many of the original Gettier cases. However, they are often undermined by newly conceived counterexamples. To avoid all possible cases, it may be necessary to find a criterion that excludes all forms of epistemic luck. It has been argued that such a criterion would set the required standards of knowledge very high: the belief has to be infallible to succeed in all cases. This would mean that very few of our beliefs amount to knowledge, if any. For example, Richard Kirkham suggests that our definition of knowledge requires that the evidence for the belief necessitates its truth. There is still very little consensus in the academic discourse as to which of the proposed modifications or reconceptualizations is correct.

Types 
A common distinction among types of knowledge is between propositional knowledge, or knowledge-that, and non-propositional knowledge in the form of practical skills or acquaintance. The distinctions between these major types are usually drawn based on the linguistic formulations used to express them.

Propositional knowledge 
Propositional knowledge, also referred to as descriptive knowledge, is a form of theoretical knowledge about facts, like knowing that "2 + 2 = 4". It is the paradigmatic type of knowledge in analytic philosophy. Propositional knowledge is propositional in the sense that it involves a relation to a proposition. Since propositions are often expressed through that-clauses, it is also referred to as knowledge-that, as in "Akari knows that kangaroos hop". In this case, Akari stands in the relation of knowing to the proposition "kangaroos hop". Closely related types of knowledge are know-wh, for example, knowing who is coming to dinner and knowing why they are coming. These expressions are normally understood as types of propositional knowledge since they usually can be paraphrased using a that-clause. It is usually held that the capacity for propositional knowledge is exclusive to relatively sophisticated creatures, such as humans. This is based on the claim that advanced intellectual capacities are required to believe a proposition that expresses what the world is like.

Propositional knowledge is either occurrent or dispositional. Occurrent knowledge is knowledge that is active, for example, because a person is currently thinking about it. Dispositional knowledge, on the other hand, is stored in the back of a person's mind without being involved in cognitive processes at the moment. In this regard, it refers to the mere ability to access the relevant information. For example, a person may know for most of their life that cats have whiskers. This knowledge is dispositional most of the time. It becomes occurrent when the person actively thinks about the whiskers of cats. A similar classification is often discussed in relation to beliefs as the difference between occurrent and dispositional beliefs.

Non-propositional knowledge 

Non-propositional knowledge is knowledge in which no essential relation to a proposition is involved. The two most well-known forms are knowledge-how (know-how or procedural knowledge) and knowledge by acquaintance. The term "know-how" refers to some form of practical ability or skill. It can be defined as having the corresponding competence. Examples include knowing how to ride a bicycle or knowing how to swim. Some of the abilities responsible for know-how may also involve certain forms of knowledge-that, as in knowing how to prove a mathematical theorem, but this is not generally the case. Some forms of practical knowledge do not require a highly developed mind, in contrast to propositional knowledge. In this regard, practical knowledge is more common in the animal kingdom. For example, an ant knows how to walk even though it presumably lacks a mind sufficiently developed enough to stand in a relation to the corresponding proposition by representing it. Knowledge-how is closely related to tacit knowledge. Tacit knowledge is knowledge that cannot be fully articulated or explained, in contrast to explicit knowledge.

Knowledge by acquaintance is familiarity with an individual that results from direct experiential contact with this individual. This individual can a person or a regular object. On the linguistic level, it does not require a that-clause and can be expressed using a direct object. So when someone claims that they know Wladimir Klitschko personally, they are expressing that they had a certain kind of contact with him and not that they know a certain fact about him. This is usually understood to mean that it constitutes a relation to a concrete individual and not to a proposition. Knowledge by acquaintance plays a central role in Bertrand Russell's epistemology. He contrasts it with knowledge by description, which is a form of propositional knowledge not based on direct perceptual experience. However, there is some controversy about whether it is possible to acquire knowledge by acquaintance in its pure non-propositional form. In this regard, some theorists, like Peter D. Klein, have suggested that it can be understood as one type of propositional knowledge that is only expressed in a grammatically different way.

Other distinctions

A priori and a posteriori 

The distinction between a priori and a posteriori knowledge came to prominence in Immanuel Kant's philosophy and is often discussed in the academic literature. To which category a knowledge attitude belongs depends on the role of experience in its formation and justification. To know something a posteriori means to know it on the basis of experience. For example, to know that it is currently raining or that the baby is crying belongs to a posteriori knowledge since it is based on some form of experience, like visual or auditory experience. A priori knowledge, however, is possible without any experience to justify or support the known proposition. Mathematical knowledge, such as that 2 + 2 = 4, is a paradigmatic case of a priori knowledge since no empirical investigation is necessary to confirm this fact. The distinction between a posteriori and a priori knowledge is usually equated with the distinction between empirical and non-empirical knowledge. This distinction pertains primarily to knowledge but it can also be applied to propositions or arguments. For example, an a priori proposition is a proposition that can be known independently of experience.

The relevant experience in question is primarily identified with sensory experience. However, some non-sensory experiences, like memory and introspection, are often included as well. But certain conscious phenomena are excluded in this context. For example, the conscious phenomenon of a rational insight into the solution of a mathematical problem does not make the resulting knowledge a posteriori. It is sometimes argued that, in a trivial sense, some form of experience is required even for a priori knowledge, the experience needed to learn the language in which the claim is expressed. For a priori knowledge, this is the only form of experience required. For this reason, knowing that "all bachelors are unmarried" is considered a form of a priori knowledge since, given an understanding of the terms "bachelor" and "unmarried", no further experience is necessary to know that it is true.

One difficulty for a priori knowledge is to explain how it is possible. It is usually seen as unproblematic that one can come to know things through experience but it is not clear how knowledge is possible without experience. One of the earliest solutions to this problem is due to Plato, who argues that, in the context of geometry, the soul already possesses the knowledge and just needs to recollect or remember it to access it again. A similar explanation is given by René Descartes, who holds that a priori knowledge exists as innate knowledge present in the mind of each human. A different approach is to posit a special mental faculty responsible for this type of knowledge, often referred to as rational insight or rational intuition.

Self-knowledge 

In philosophy, "self-knowledge" usually refers to a person's knowledge of their own sensations, thoughts, beliefs, and other mental states. Many philosophers hold that it is a special type of knowledge since it is more direct than knowledge of the external world, which is mediated through the senses. Traditionally, it was often claimed that self-knowledge is indubitable. For example, when someone is in pain, they cannot be wrong about this fact. However, various contemporary theorists reject this position. A closely related issue is to explain how self-knowledge works. Some philosophers, like Russell, understand it as a form of knowledge by acquaintance while others, like John Locke, claim that there is an inner sense that works in analogy to how the external five senses work. According to a different perspective, self-knowledge is indirect in the sense that a person has to interpret their internal and external behavior in order to learn about their mental states, similar to how one can learn about the mental states of other people by interpreting their external behavior.

In a slightly different sense, the term self-knowledge can also refer to the knowledge of the self as a persisting entity that has certain personality traits, preferences, physical attributes, relationships, goals, and social identities. This meaning is of particular interest to psychology and refers to a person's awareness of their own characteristics. Self-knowledge is closely related to self-concept, the difference being that the self-concept also includes unrealistic aspects of how a person sees themselves. In this regard, self-knowledge is often measured by comparing a person's self-assessment of their character traits with how other people assess this person's traits.

Situated knowledge 

Situated knowledge is knowledge specific to a particular situation. It is closely related to practical or tacit knowledge, which is learned and applied in specific circumstances. This especially concerns certain forms of acquiring knowledge, such as trial and error or learning from experience. In this regard, situated knowledge usually lacks a more explicit structure and is not articulated in terms of universal ideas. The term is often used in feminism and postmodernism to argue that many forms of knowledge are not absolute but depend on the concrete historical, cultural, and linguistic context. Understood in this way, it is frequently used to argue against absolute or universal knowledge claims stated in the scientific discourse. Donna Haraway is a prominent defender of this position. One of her arguments is based on the idea that perception is embodied and is not a universal "gaze from nowhere".

Higher and lower knowledge 
Many forms of eastern spirituality and religion distinguish between higher and lower knowledge. They are also referred to as para vidya and apara vidya in Hinduism or the two truths doctrine in Buddhism. Lower knowledge is based on the senses and the intellect. In this regard, all forms of empirical and objective knowledge belong to this category. Most of the knowledge needed in one's everyday functioning is lower knowledge. It is about mundane or conventional things that are in tune with common sense. It includes the body of knowledge belonging to the empirical sciences.

Higher knowledge, on the other hand, is understood as knowledge of God, the absolute, the true self, or the ultimate reality. It belongs neither to the external world of physical objects nor to the internal world of the experience of emotions and concepts. Many spiritual teachings emphasize the increased importance, or sometimes even exclusive importance, of higher knowledge in comparison to lower knowledge. This is usually based on the idea that achieving higher knowledge is one of the central steps on the spiritual path. In this regard, higher knowledge is seen as what frees the individual from ignorance, helps them realize God, or liberates them from the cycle of rebirth. This is often combined with the view that lower knowledge is in some way based on a delusion: it belongs to the realm of mere appearances or Maya, while higher knowledge manages to view the reality underlying these appearances. In the Buddhist tradition, the attainment of higher knowledge or ultimate truth is often associated with seeing the world from the perspective of sunyata, i.e. as a form of emptiness lacking inherent existence or intrinsic nature.

Sources of knowledge 

Sources of knowledge are ways how people come to know things. According to Andrea Kern, they can be understood as rational capacities that are exercised when a person acquires new knowledge. Various sources of knowledge are discussed in the academic literature, often in terms of the mental faculties responsible. They include perception, introspection, memory, inference, and testimony. However, not everyone agrees that all of them actually lead to knowledge. Usually, perception or observation, i.e. using one of the senses, is identified as the most important source of empirical knowledge. So knowing that the baby is sleeping constitutes observational knowledge if it was caused by a perception of the snoring baby. But this would not be the case if one learned about this fact through a telephone conversation with one's spouse. Direct realists explain observational knowledge by holding that perception constitutes a direct contact with the perceived object. Indirect realists, on the other hand, contend that this contact happens indirectly: people can only directly perceive sense data, which are then interpreted as representing external objects. This distinction affects whether the knowledge of external objects is direct or indirect and may thus have an impact on how certain perceptual knowledge is.

Introspection is often seen in analogy to perception as a source of knowledge, not of external physical objects, but of internal mental states. Traditionally, various theorists have ascribed a special epistemic status to introspection by claiming that it is infallible or that there is no introspective difference between appearance and reality. However, this claim has been contested in the contemporary discourse. Critics argue that it may be possible, for example, to mistake an unpleasant itch for a pain or to confuse the experience of a slight ellipse for the experience of a circle. Perceptual and introspective knowledge often act as a form of fundamental or basic knowledge. According to some empiricists, perceptual knowledge is the only source of basic knowledge and provides the foundation for all other knowledge.

Memory is usually identified as another source of knowledge. It differs from perception and introspection in that it is not as independent or fundamental as they are since it depends on other previous experiences. The faculty of memory retains knowledge acquired in the past and makes it accessible in the present, as when remembering a past event or a friend's phone number. It is generally considered a reliable source of knowledge, but it can be deceptive at times nonetheless, either because the original experience was unreliable or because the memory degraded and does not accurately represent the original experience anymore.

Knowledge based on perception, introspection, or memory may also give rise to inferential knowledge, which comes about when reasoning is applied to draw inferences from another known fact. In this regard, the perceptual knowledge of a Czech stamp on a postcard may give rise to the inferential knowledge that one's friend is visiting the Czech Republic. According to rationalists, some forms of knowledge are completely independent of observation and introspection. They are needed to explain how certain a priori beliefs, like the mathematical belief that 2 + 2 = 4, constitute knowledge. Some theorists, like Robert Audi, hold that the faculty of pure reason or rational intuition is responsible in these cases since there seem to be no sensory perceptions that could justify such general and abstract knowledge. However, difficulties in providing a clear account of pure reason or rational intuition have led various empirically minded epistemologists to doubt that they constitute independent sources of knowledge. A closely related approach is to hold that this type of knowledge is innate. According to Plato's theory of recollection, for example, it is accessed through a special form of remembering.

Testimony is often included as an additional source of knowledge. Unlike the other sources, it is not tied to one specific cognitive faculty. Instead, it is based on the idea that one person can come to know a fact because another person talks about this fact. Testimony can happen in numerous ways, like regular speech, a letter, the newspaper, or an online blog. The problem of testimony consists in clarifying under what circumstances and why it constitutes a source of knowledge. A popular response is that it depends on the reliability of the person pronouncing the testimony: only testimony from reliable sources can lead to knowledge.

Structure of knowledge 
The structure of knowledge is the way in which the mental states of a person need to be related to each other for knowledge to arise. Most theorists hold that, among other things, an agent has to have good reasons for holding a belief if this belief is to amount to knowledge. So when challenged, the agent may justify their belief by referring to their reason for holding it. In many cases, this reason is itself a belief that may as well be challenged. So when the agent believes that Ford cars are cheaper than BMWs because they believe to have heard this from a reliable source, they may be challenged to justify why they believe that their source is reliable. Whatever support they present may also be challenged. This threatens to lead to an infinite regress since the epistemic status at each step depends on the epistemic status of the previous step. Theories of the structure of knowledge offer responses for how to solve this problem.

The three most common theories are foundationalism, coherentism, and infinitism. Foundationalists and coherentists deny the existence of this infinite regress, in contrast to infinitists. According to foundationalists, some basic reasons have their epistemic status independent of other reasons and thereby constitute the endpoint of the regress. Against this view, it has been argued that the concept of "basic reason" is contradictory: there should be a reason for why some reasons are basic and others are non-basic, in which case the basic reasons would depend on another reason after all and would therefore not be basic. An additional problem consists in finding plausible candidates for basic reasons.

Coherentists and infinitists avoid these problems by denying the distinction between basic and non-basic reasons. Coherentists argue that there is only a finite number of reasons, which mutually support each other and thereby ensure each other's epistemic status. Their critics contend that this constitutes the fallacy of circular reasoning. For example, if belief b1 supports belief b2 and belief b2 supports belief b1, the agent has a reason for accepting one belief if they already have the other. However, their mutual support alone is not a good reason for newly accepting both beliefs at once. A closely related issue is that there can be various distinct sets of coherent beliefs and coherentists face the problem of explaining why someone should accept one coherent set rather than another. For infinitists, in contrast to foundationalists and coherentists, there is an infinite number of reasons. This position faces the problem of explaining how human knowledge is possible at all, as it seems that the human mind is limited and cannot possess an infinite number of reasons. In their traditional forms, both foundationalists and coherentists face the Gettier problem, i.e. that having a reason or justification for a true belief is not sufficient for knowledge in cases where cognitive luck is responsible for the success.

Value of knowledge 

Knowledge may be valuable either because it is useful or because it is good in itself. Knowledge can be useful by helping a person achieve their goals. An example of this form of instrumental value is knowledge of a disease, which can be beneficial because it enables a person to identify and treat the disease. Or to reach an important job interview, knowledge of where and when it takes place helps the person arrive there on time. However, this does not imply that knowledge is always useful. In this regard, many true beliefs about trivial matters have neither positive nor negative value. This concerns, for example, knowing how many grains of sand are on a specific beach or memorizing phone numbers one never intends to call. In a few cases, knowledge may even have a negative value. For example, if a person's life depends on gathering the courage to jump over a ravine, then having a true belief about the involved dangers may hinder the person to do so.

Besides having instrumental value, knowledge may also have intrinsic value. This means that certain forms of knowledge are good in themselves even if they do not provide any practical benefits. According to Duncan Pritchard, this applies to certain forms of knowledge associated with wisdom. The value of knowledge is relevant to the field of education, specifically to the issue of choosing which knowledge should be passed on to the student.

A more specific issue in epistemology concerns the question of whether or why knowledge is more valuable than mere true belief. There is wide agreement that knowledge is good in some sense but the thesis that knowledge is better than true belief is controversial. An early discussion of this problem is found in Plato's Meno in relation to the claim that both knowledge and true belief can successfully guide action and, therefore, have apparently the same value. For example, it seems that mere true belief is as effective as knowledge when trying to find the way to Larissa. According to Plato, knowledge is better because it is more stable. A different approach is to hold that knowledge gets its additional value from justification. However, if the value in question is understood primarily as an instrumental value, it is not clear in what sense knowledge is better than mere true belief since they are usually equally useful.

The problem of the value of knowledge is often discussed in relation to reliabilism and virtue epistemology. Reliabilism can be defined as the thesis that knowledge is reliably-formed true belief. On this view, it is difficult to explain how a reliable belief-forming process adds additional value. According to an analogy by Linda Zagzebski, a cup of coffee made by a reliable coffee machine has the same value as an equally good cup of coffee made by an unreliable coffee machine. This difficulty in solving the value problem is sometimes used as an argument against reliabilism. Virtue epistemologists see knowledge as the manifestation of cognitive virtues and can thus argue that knowledge has additional value due to its association with virtue. However, not everyone agrees that knowledge actually has additional value over true belief. A similar view is defended by Jonathan Kvanvig, who argues that the main epistemic value resides not in knowledge but in understanding, which implies grasping how one's beliefs cohere with each other.

Philosophical skepticism 

Philosophical skepticism in its strongest form, also referred to as global skepticism, is the thesis that humans lack any form of knowledge or that knowledge is impossible. Very few philosophers have explicitly defended this position. However, it has been influential nonetheless, usually in a negative sense: many researchers see it as a serious challenge to any epistemological theory and often try to show how their preferred theory overcomes it. For example, it is commonly accepted that perceptual experience constitutes a source of knowledge. However, according to the dream argument, this is not the case since dreaming provides unreliable information and since the agent could be dreaming without knowing it. Because of this inability to discriminate between dream and perception, it is argued that there is no perceptual knowledge. A similar often cited thought experiment assumes that the agent is actually a brain in a vat that is just fed electrical stimuli. Such a brain would have the false impression of having a body and interacting with the external world. The basic argument is the same: since the agent is unable to tell the difference, they do not know that they have a body responsible for reliable perceptions.

One issue revealed through these thought experiments is the problem of underdetermination: that the evidence available is not sufficient to make a rational decision between competing theories. And if two contrary hypotheses explain the appearances equally well, then the agent is not justified in believing one of those hypotheses rather than the other. Based on this premise, the general skeptic has to argue that this is true for all our knowledge, that there is always an alternative and very different explanation. Another skeptic argument is based on the idea that human cognition is fallible and therefore lacks absolute certainty. More specific arguments target particular theories of knowledge, such as foundationalism or coherentism, and try to show that their concept of knowledge is deeply flawed. An important argument against global skepticism is that it seems to contradict itself: the claim that there is no knowledge appears to constitute a knowledge-claim itself. Other responses come from common sense philosophy and reject global skepticism based on the fact that it contradicts many plausible ordinary beliefs. It is then argued against skepticism by seeing common sense as more reliable than the abstract reasoning cited in favor of skepticism.

Certain less radical forms of skepticism deny that knowledge exists within a specific area or discipline, sometimes referred to as local or selective skepticism. It is often motivated by the idea that certain phenomena do not accurately represent their subject matter. They may thus lead to false impressions concerning its nature. External world skeptics hold that one can only know about one's own sensory impressions and experiences but not about the external world. This is based on the idea that beliefs about the external world are mediated through the senses. The senses are faulty at times and may thus show things that are not really there. This problem is avoided on the level of sensory impressions, which are given to the experiencer directly without an intermediary. In this sense, the person may be wrong about seeing a red Ferrari in the street (it might have been a Maserati or a mere light reflection) but they cannot be wrong about having a sensory impression of the color red.

The inverse path is taken by some materialists, who accept the existence of the external physical world but deny the existence of the internal realm of mind and consciousness based on the difficulty of explaining how the two realms can exist together. Other forms of local skepticism accept scientific knowledge but deny the possibility of moral knowledge, for example, because there is no reliable way to empirically measure whether a moral claim is true or false.

The issue of the definition and standards of knowledge is central to the question of whether skepticism in its different forms is true. If very high standards are used, for example, that knowledge implies infallibility, then skepticism becomes more plausible. In this case, the skeptic only has to show that no belief is absolutely certain; that while the actual belief is true, it could have been false. However, the more these standards are weakened to how the term is used in everyday language, the less plausible skepticism becomes. For example, such a position is defended in the pragmatist epistemology, which sees all beliefs and theories as fallible hypotheses and holds that they may need to be revised as new evidence is acquired.

In various disciplines

Formal epistemology 
Formal epistemology studies knowledge using formal tools, such as mathematics and logic. An important issue in this field concerns the epistemic principles of knowledge. These are rules governing how knowledge and related states behave and in what relations they stand to each other. The transparency principle, also referred to as the luminosity of knowledge, is an often discussed principle. It states that knowing something implies the second-order knowledge that one knows it. This principle implies that if Heike knows that today is Monday, then she also knows that she knows that today is Monday. Other commonly discussed principles are the conjunction principle, the closure principle, and the evidence transfer principle. For example, the conjunction principle states that having two justified beliefs in two separate propositions implies that the agent is also justified in believing the conjunction of these two propositions. In this regard, if Bob knows that dogs are animals and he also knows that cats are animals, then he knows the conjunction of these two propositions, i.e. he knows that dogs and cats are animals.

Science 

The scientific approach is usually regarded as an exemplary process for how to gain knowledge about empirical facts. Scientific knowledge includes mundane knowledge about easily observable facts, for example, chemical knowledge that certain reactants become hot when mixed together. But it also encompasses knowledge of less tangible issues, like claims about the behavior of genes, neutrinos, and black holes.

A key aspect of most forms of science is that they seek natural laws that explain empirical observations. Scientific knowledge is discovered and tested using the scientific method. This method aims to arrive at reliable knowledge by formulating the problem in a clear manner and by ensuring that the evidence used to support or refute a specific theory is public, reliable, and replicable. This way, other researchers can repeat the experiments and observations in the initial study to confirm or disconfirm it. The scientific method is often analyzed as a series of steps. According to some formulations, it begins with regular observation and data collection. Based on these insights, the scientists then try to find a hypothesis that explains the observations. The hypothesis is then tested using a controlled experiment to compare whether predictions based on the hypothesis match the actual results. As a last step, the results are interpreted and a conclusion is reached whether and to what degree the findings confirm or disconfirm the hypothesis.

The progress of scientific knowledge is traditionally seen as a gradual and continuous process in which the existing body of knowledge is increased in each step. However, this view has been challenged by various philosophers of science, such as Thomas Kuhn, who holds that between phases of incremental progress, there are so-called scientific revolutions in which a paradigm shift occurs. According to this view, various fundamental assumptions are changed due to the paradigm shift, resulting in a radically new perspective on the body of scientific knowledge that is incommensurable with the previous outlook.

Religion 

Knowledge plays a central role in many religions. Knowledge claims about the existence of God or religious doctrines about how each one should live their lives are found in almost every culture. However, such knowledge claims are often controversial and are commonly rejected by religious skeptics and atheists. The epistemology of religion is the field of inquiry that investigates whether belief in God and in other religious doctrines is rational and amounts to knowledge. One important view in this field is evidentialism. It states that belief in religious doctrines is justified if it is supported by sufficient evidence. Suggested examples of evidence for religious doctrines include religious experiences such as direct contact with the divine or inner testimony as when hearing God's voice. However, evidentialists often reject that belief in religious doctrines amount to knowledge based on the claim that there is not sufficient evidence. A famous saying in this regard is due to Bertrand Russell. When asked how he would justify his lack of belief in God when facing his judgment after death, he replied "Not enough evidence, God! Not enough evidence."

However, religious teachings about the existence and nature of God are not always understood as knowledge claims by their defenders and some explicitly state that the proper attitude towards such doctrines is not knowledge but faith. This is often combined with the assumption that these doctrines are true but cannot be fully understood by reason or verified through rational inquiry. For this reason, it is claimed that one should accept them even though they do not amount to knowledge. Such a view is reflected in a famous saying by Immanuel Kant where he claims that he "had to deny knowledge in order to make room for faith."

Distinct religions often differ from each other concerning the doctrines they proclaim as well as their understanding of the role of knowledge in religious practice. In both the Jewish and the Christian tradition, knowledge plays a role in the fall of man in which Adam and Eve were expelled from the Garden of Eden. Responsible for this fall was that they ignored God's command and ate from the tree of knowledge, which gave them the knowledge of good and evil. This is understood as a rebellion against God since this knowledge belongs to God and it is not for humans to decide what is right or wrong. In the Christian literature, knowledge is seen as one of the seven gifts of the Holy Spirit. In Islam, "the Knowing" (al-ʿAlīm) is one of the 99 names reflecting distinct attributes of God. The Qur'an asserts that knowledge comes from God and the acquisition of knowledge is encouraged in the teachings of Muhammad.

In Buddhism, knowledge that leads to liberation is called vijjā. It contrasts with avijjā or ignorance, which is understood as the root of all suffering. This is often explained in relation to the claim that humans suffer because they crave things that are impermanent. The ignorance of the impermanent nature of things is seen as the factor responsible for this craving. The central goal of Buddhist practice is to stop suffering. This aim is to be achieved by understanding and practicing the teaching known as the Four Noble Truths and thereby overcoming ignorance. Knowledge plays a key role in the classical path of Hinduism known as jñāna yoga or "path of knowledge". Its aim is to achieve oneness with the divine by fostering an understanding of the self and its relation to Brahman or ultimate reality.

Anthropology 
The anthropology of knowledge is a multi-disciplinary field of inquiry. It studies how knowledge is acquired, stored, retrieved, and communicated. Special interest is given to how knowledge is reproduced and undergoes changes in relation to social and cultural circumstances. In this context, the term knowledge is used in a very broad sense, roughly equivalent to terms like understanding and culture. This means that the forms and reproduction of understanding are studied irrespective of their truth value. In epistemology, on the other hand, knowledge is usually restricted to forms of true belief. The main focus in anthropology is on empirical observations of how people ascribe truth values to meaning contents, like when affirming an assertion, even if these contents are false. But it also includes practical components: knowledge is what is employed when interpreting and acting on the world and involves diverse phenomena, such as feelings, embodied skills, information, and concepts. It is used to understand and anticipate events in order to prepare and react accordingly.

The reproduction of knowledge and its changes often happen through some form of communication. This includes face-to-face discussions and online communications as well as seminars and rituals. An important role in this context falls to institutions, like university departments or scientific journals in the academic context. A tradition or traditional knowledge may be defined as knowledge that has been reproduced within a society or geographic region over several generations. However, societies also respond to various external influences, such as other societies, whose understanding is often interpreted and incorporated in a modified form.

Individuals belonging to the same social group usually understand things and organize knowledge in similar ways to one another. In this regard, social identities play a significant role: individuals who associate themselves with similar identities, like age-influenced, professional, religious, and ethnic identities, tend to embody similar forms of knowledge. Such identities concern both how an individual sees themselves, for example, in terms of the ideals they pursue, as well as how other people see them, such as the expectations they have toward the individual.

Sociology 

The sociology of knowledge is closely related to the anthropology of knowledge. It is the subfield of sociology that investigates how thought and society are related to each other. In it, the term "knowledge" is understood in a very wide sense that encompasses many types of mental products. It includes philosophical and political ideas as well as religious and ideological doctrines and can also be applied to folklore, law, and technology. In this regard, knowledge is sometimes treated as a synonym for culture. The sociology of knowledge studies in what sociohistorical circumstances knowledge arises and on what existential conditions it depends. The investigated conditions can include physical, demographic, economic, and sociocultural factors. The sociology of knowledge differs from most forms of epistemology since its main focus is on the question of how ideas originate and what consequences they have rather than asking whether these ideas are coherent or correct. An example of a theory in this field is due to Karl Marx, who claims that the dominant ideology in a society is a product of and changes with the underlying socioeconomic conditions. A related perspective is found in certain forms of decolonial scholarship that claim that colonial powers are responsible for the hegemony of western knowledge systems and seek a decolonization of knowledge to undermine this hegemony.

See also 
 Common knowledge
 Domain knowledge
 Epistemic modal logic
 General knowledge
 Inductive inference
 Inductive probability
 Intelligence
 Knowledge falsification
 Knowledge transfer
 Metaknowledge
 Omniscience
 Outline of human intelligence
 Outline of knowledge

References

Notes

Citations

Bibliography

External links 
 
 
 
 
 
 

Knowledge
Concepts in epistemology
Intelligence
Mental content
Virtue
Main topic articles